A general election was held in the U.S. state of Washington on November 8, 2016. The primary was held on August 2.

At the time of the filing deadline of May 20, 2016, 682 candidates had filed for 345 offices statewide.

Federal

President of the United States

Washington had 12 electoral votes for the presidential election, which were awarded to Hillary Clinton.

Statewide party caucuses and primaries were held in the spring of 2016 to determine the allocation of state delegates to the respective Democratic and Republican party national conventions. Bernie Sanders won the Democratic caucus in March, defeating Hillary Clinton and taking 73 percent of delegates; Donald Trump won the Republican primary, taking 76 percent of delegates. A non-binding primary for the Democratic party held in May resulted in a victory for Hillary Clinton.

United States House of Representatives

All 10 of Washington's seats in the United States House of Representatives were up for re-election. All but one of the incumbents ran for re-election, the exception being Jim McDermott (D) of the 7th district. McDermott's seat was won by Pramila Jayapal (D). The remaining seats were retained by the incumbents.

United States Senate

Incumbent Democratic senior Senator Patty Murray ran for re-election to a fifth term in office, defeating Republican challenger Chris Vance by 18 points.

Statewide

Governor

Incumbent Governor Jay Inslee was re-elected to his second term over Port of Seattle Commissioner Bill Bryant.

Lieutenant Governor

Incumbent Lieutenant Governor Brad Owen, first elected to the office in 1996, announced that he would not seek a sixth term.

Four Democrats (three of whom were state senators), four Republicans, two third-party candidates, and one independent competed in the primary election. Marty McClendon (R) and Cyrus Habib (D) finished as top two and advanced to the general election, which Habib won by 9 points.

Polling

General election

Attorney General 

Incumbent Attorney General Bob Ferguson, elected in 2012 as a Democrat, sought reelection, opposed by Joshua B. Trumbull, who ran as a Libertarian.

Secretary of State 

Incumbent Secretary of State Kim Wyman, elected in 2012 as the only Republican to hold a statewide office on the West Coast, sought reelection. Former Seattle City Councilmember Tina Podlodowski announced her bid in January 2016, seeking to become the first Democrat to hold the office since 1965. Wyman retained her seat with 55% of the vote.

State Auditor

Incumbent State Auditor Troy Kelley, elected as a Democrat in 2012, was indicted over federal charges of felony theft and money-laundering. Several attempts to remove him from office, including a threat of impeachment by the legislature, proved unsuccessful. Kelley did not file to run for a second term.

Two Democratic, one Republican and two independent candidates competed in the primary. Mark Miloscia (R) and Pat McCarthy (D) finished as top two and advanced to the general election. McCarthy won by 5 points.

Polling

General election

State Treasurer

Incumbent James McIntire announced on December 16, 2015, that he would not seek a third term as Washington State Treasurer. Five candidates are running to succeed him: state senator Marko Liias, former Port of Seattle commissioner Alec Fisken, pension consultant John Paul Comerford, Benton County treasurer Duane Davidson, and investment firm executive Michael Waite. Liias, Fisken, and Comerford are running as Democrats; Davidson and Waite, as Republicans.

Duane Davidson and Michael Waite, both Republicans, finished as top two in the primary election and advanced to the general election, marking the first time since the top-two system had been instituted that both of the primary slots in any statewide race had been won by Republicans.

In the general election, Duane Davidson received the endorsements of every county treasurer in Washington state, both Democrat and Republican, as well as Washington Secretary of State Kim Wyman. Michael Waite was endorsed by former Democratic state Auditor Brian Sonntag and former state Attorney General Rob McKenna.

Davidson won the general election for Treasurer. This was the first time a Republican had been elected to the office of Treasurer of Washington in more than 50 years.

Polling

General election

Public Lands Commissioner 
Incumbent Public Lands Commissioner Peter J. Goldmark, elected in 2008 and reelected in 2012, announced his intention to not seek a third term in office.

Five Democrats, one Republican, and one Libertarian competed in the primary. Steve McLaughlin (R) and Hilary Franz (D) finished as top two and advanced to the general election. Franz was elected with 53% of the vote.

Polling

General election

Superintendent of Public Instruction
Incumbent Randy Dorn declined to run for a third term as Superintendent of Public Instruction. Nine candidates ran in the nonpartisan election. Erin Jones and Chris Reykdal finished as top two and advanced to the general election. In a close race, Reykdal edged out Jones by one point. Jones conceded the election on November 22.

Polling

General election

Insurance Commissioner 
Mike Kreidler was reelected to his fifth term.

Polling

General election

Legislative

State Senate

Twenty-five of the forty-nine seats in the Washington State Senate were up for election. Republicans held a narrow majority in the Senate, taking 26 seats compared to 23 for the Democrats. Seven incumbent senators retired, creating vacancies that had the potential to swing the split of party votes. A Democrat defeated the Republican incumbent in District 41, leaving Republicans with a one-seat majority.

State House of Representatives

All 98 seats in the Washington House of Representatives were up for election. The outgoing House had a narrow Democratic majority, with 50 seats compared to the Republicans' 48. Both parties picked up seats from the other party, resulting in the same overall composition.

Ballot measures
 Washington Initiative 732 proposed a revenue-neutral carbon tax to fight global warming. The measure would have imposed a fee on carbon dioxide emissions within the state, decreased the state's sales tax and business tax, and expanded the state's version of the earned income tax credit. It was rejected by voters on November 8.
 Voters approved a minimum wage increase by a 57% vote. The initiative calls for increasing the state’s minimum wage to $13.50 an hour by 2020 from $9.47.
 Voters approved Sound Transit 3, building 62 Miles of Light Rail.
 Voters approved a firearms access ballot measure; the initiative calls for allowing courts to issue “extreme risk protection orders” to temporarily prevent people from owning or obtaining firearms if there is a risk of harm to themselves or others.
 Voters repealed a dental insurance tax.
 Voters repealed Advisory Vote 15 for alternative fuel vehicles.
 Voters rejected a campaign finance initiative, Initiative 1464.
 Voters approved a measure to increase fines for fraud.
 Voters voted against an effort to create a carbon emissions tax.
 Voters approved an initiative to denounce Citizen's United.
 Voters approved a redistricting deadline.

Local elections
John Blom defeated Tanisha L. Harris for Clark City Council District 3.
Eileen Quiring defeated Roman Battan for Clark City Council District 4.
Nancy Barnes defeated Mike Lyons for Public Utility District No. 1 of Clark County Commissioner in District No. 2.
City of Vancouver Proposition No. 1 was approved.
City of Woodland Transportation Benefit District Proposition No. 1 was approved.
Battle Ground School District No. 119 Proposition No. 1 was approved.

See also
 Elections in Washington (state)

References

External links
 Elections & Voting at the Washington Secretary of State
 Washington at Ballotpedia

 
Washington